The 1999 Yobe State gubernatorial election occurred on January 9, 1999. APP candidate Bukar Ibrahim won the election, defeating PDP candidate.

Results
Bukar Ibrahim from the APP won the election. PDP and AD candidates contested in the election.

The total number of registered voters in the state was 877,580, total votes cast was 317,243, valid votes was 294,572 and rejected votes was 22,671.

Bukar Ibrahim, (APP)- 150,688
PDP- 140,948

AD- 2,936

References 

Yobe State gubernatorial election
Yobe State gubernatorial election
1999